Robert Harry Chrystal (April 3, 1930 – January 27, 2023) was a Canadian professional ice hockey defenceman.  Chrystal played 132 regular season games for the New York Rangers between 1953 and 1955. He scored 11 goals and 14 assists for 25 points. Chrystal died on January 27, 2023, at the age of 92.

Career statistics

Awards and achievements
MJHL First All-Star Team (1949 & 1950)
USHL Second All-Star Team (1951)
Calder Cup (AHL) Championship (1953)
WHL Championship (1957)
WHL Prairie Division First All-Star Team (1957 & 1958)
"Honoured Member" of the Manitoba Hockey Hall of Fame

References

External links

1930 births
2023 deaths
Brandon Regals players
Brandon Wheat Kings players
Canadian ice hockey defencemen
New York Rangers players
Saskatoon Quakers players
Saskatoon Regals/St. Paul Saints players
Ice hockey people from Winnipeg
Winnipeg Warriors (minor pro) players